The One That Got Away may refer to:

Film and television
The One That Got Away (1957 film), about Franz von Werra
The One That Got Away (1964 film), an Australian TV film
The One That Got Away (1996 film), an ITV television film adaptation of the Chris Ryan book
The One That Got Away (Philippine TV series), a 2018 drama series aired on GMA Network
The One That Got Away (American TV series), a 2022 dating reality television series
"The One That Got Away" (American Dad!), an episode of the television show
"The One That Got Away" (Modern Family), an episode of the television show
"The One That Got Away" (NYPD Blue), an episode of the television show
"The One That Got Away" (Touched by an Angel episode), 1996
"The One That Got Away!", an episode of the television show The Raccoons
"The One That Got Away", an episode of the television show Little Bear

Literature
The One That Got Away (book), a 1995 book written under the pseudonym 'Chris Ryan' about the Gulf War
The One That Got Away, a 1956 book by James Leasor about Franz von Werra
The One That Got Away, a 2008 collection of short stories by Zoë Wicomb, set in Cape Town and Glasgow
The Ones that Got Away, a 2011 book by Stephen Graham Jones

Music

Albums
The One That Got Away (album), a 1993 album by Thin White Rope

Songs
"The One That Got Away" (Natasha Bedingfield song), 2006
"The One That Got Away" (Katy Perry song), 2011
"The One That Got Away" (Jake Owen song), 2012
"The One That Got Away", a 1976 song by Tom Waits from his album Small Change
"The One That Got Away", a 1984 song by Al Stewart from his album Russians & Americans
"The One That Got Away", a 1990 song by John Gorka from his album Land of the Bottom Line
"The One That Got Away", a 1990 song by Little River Band from their album Get Lucky
"The One That Got Away", a 2006 song by Pink from her album I'm Not Dead
"The One That Got Away", a 2011 song by April Smith & The Great Picture Show from their album Songs for a Sinking Ship
"The One That Got Away", a 2013 song by The Civil Wars from their album The Civil Wars

See also
"One That Got Away", a song by Michael Ray
"The Man That Got Away", a torch song published in 1953, sung by Judy Garland in the 1954 film A Star Is Born